Events in the year 1887 in India.

Incumbents
 Empress of India – Queen Victoria
 Viceroy of India – The Earl of Dufferin

Events
 National income - 4,525 million
Trinity College London examiners conducted music examinations in Mumbai for the first time.
India formed the Central Special Branch, now called the Intelligence Bureau (IB). It is India's equivalent to the US's Federal Bureau of Investigation (FBI). The Intelligence Bureau is said to be the oldest organization of its type.

Law
Provincial Small Cause Courts Act
Suits Valuation Act
Conversion Of India Stock Act (British statute)
British Settlements Act (British statute)
Superannuation Act (British statute)
Appellate Jurisdiction Act (British statute)

Births
 26 February - Benegal Narsing Rau, Indian civil servant, jurist, diplomat and statesman (died 1953)
 22 December – Srinivasa Ramanujan, mathematician (died 1920)

References

 
India
India
1880s in India
Years of the 19th century in India